Park Byeong-hun (born March 16, 1973) is a South Korean sprint canoer who competed in the early 1990s. He was eliminated in the heats of the K-4 1000 m event at the 1992 Summer Olympics in Barcelona.

External links
Sports-Reference.com profile

1973 births
Canoeists at the 1992 Summer Olympics
Living people
Olympic canoeists of South Korea
South Korean male canoeists
Korea National Sport University alumni